The  is a limited express electric multiple unit (EMU) train type operated by the private railway operator Kintetsu Railway since 1992.

Formations
, the fleet consists of 15 four-car sets and 13 two-car sets.

4-car sets
The four-car sets are formed as shown below. All cars are motored.

The 22100 and 22300 cars are each fitted with one scissors type pantograph.

2-car sets
The two-car sets are formed as shown below. All cars are motored.

The 22100 cars are each fitted with two scissors type pantographs.

Bogies

Interior

Refurbishment

The entire fleet is scheduled to undergo a programme of refurbishment from 2015, with new interiors and a new yellow and white livery. The first trainset treated, AL10, was completed in November 2015 and returned to service on 13 December.

References

Further reading

External links

 Kintetsu 22000 series official information 

Electric multiple units of Japan
22000 series
Train-related introductions in 1992
Kinki Sharyo multiple units
1500 V DC multiple units of Japan